The H.E. Boehmler House is a historic dwelling located in Hampton, Iowa, United States.  Boehmler was a pharmacist, and his wife conducted art classes in their home.  This house was built in 1915, and designed in the Prairie School style by J.H. Jeffers and Einar Broaten.  The two-story brick structure features banded windows, belt courses, a low hipped roof, wide eaves, and a connecting arbor-and-fence extension from the house to the garage.  It was listed on the National Register of Historic Places in 1991.

References

Houses completed in 1915
Hampton, Iowa
Houses in Franklin County, Iowa
National Register of Historic Places in Franklin County, Iowa
Houses on the National Register of Historic Places in Iowa
Prairie School architecture in Iowa